Charles Grafton Page (January 25, 1812  May 5, 1868) was an American scientist who developed several electrical devices for which he obtained United States patents. He was also a physician, patent examiner, and college professor of chemistry. Like contemporaries Joseph Henry and Michael Faraday, Page began his career as a naturally curious investigator who conducted original research through direct observation and experimentation. Through his experimentation, Page helped develop a scientific understanding of the principles of electromagnetism. Page served as a patent examiner at the United States Patent Office, where his knowledge of electromagnetism was useful in the innovation process and in his own desire to develop electromagnetic locomotion. His work had a lasting impact on telegraphy and in the practice and politics of patenting scientific innovation. Page's views of patenting innovations challenged a commonly held belief at the time that maintained that scientists do not patent their inventions.

Through his investigations of inductive coils, Page developed a device which he called the dynamic multiplier. In this device, an electrical impulse is provided to the inductive coil, resulting in a high voltage. In certain configurations of Page's device that involve an electromagnet, the impulse provided to the device results in an audio tone. Page called this "galvanic music". Alexander Graham Bell and others developed telephone technology based on this peculiar electro-acoustic phenomenon.

Page advocated the use of electroconvulsive therapy as a medical treatment. He believed that electrical voltages higher than the typical low voltage of batteries would result in medical benefits.

Early family life
Charles Grafton Page was born to Captain Jere Lee Page and Lucy Lang Page on January 25, 1812, in Salem, Massachusetts. He was a descendant of John Page who had come from England in 1630 and settled in Massachusetts.
Having eight siblings, four of each gender, he was the only one of five sons to pursue a career into mature adulthood. One of his brothers died in infancy. His brother George died from typhoid at age sixteen, his brother Jery perished on a sea expedition to the Caribbean at age twenty-five, and Henry, afflicted by poliomyelitis, was not able to support himself. In writing to Page during his final ill-fated voyage Jery expressed the family's hope for his success.

Page's curiosity about electricity was evident from childhood. At age nine, he climbed on top of his parents' house with a fire-shovel in an attempt to catch electricity during a thunderstorm. At age ten, he built an electrostatic machine that he used to give his friends electric shocks. At sixteen, Page developed the "portable electrophorus," which served as the foundation for his first published article in American Journal of Science ("Notice of some New Electrical Instruments", 1834). Page's other early interests included botany, entomology, and floriculture which contributed to his scientific training and later hobbies and pastimes.

Mid life and education
Page prepared for college in the Salem Grammar School under the charge of Theodore Eames. He entered Harvard College in 1828 when he was 16 years old graduating in 1832, studying medicine with A. L. Peirson at Harvard Medical School. In 1836, he received the degree for being a Medical Doctor. At Harvard College he studied chemistry under John White Webster. Henry Wheatland, a classmate at Salem Latin School who also attended college and medical school with him, described Page as popular, fun-loving, athletic, a fine singer and "a loved companion". Page participated in organizing a college chemical club where he demonstrated electricity and other phenomena. While pursuing a medical degree from Harvard Medical School in 1836, he gave lectures in chemistry to college students.

Page continued to reside in his parents' Salem home in Virginia from 1838 and opened a small medical practice after graduating becoming a medical doctor for two years. In a well-stocked lab that he set up there, he experimented with electricity, demonstrated effects that no one had observed before, and constructed original electromagnetic mechanisms that intensified these effects. In 1838, his father retired from a successful career as a sea captain in trade with East India. In 1840, he relocated his entire family to Fairfax County in rural Virginia some five miles from Washington, D.C., where he purchased a half-section of land containing .

In 1840 he took a position in the US Patent Office as an examiner. Page continued his experimental research and set up a medical practice as a country doctor for a few years when he had moved to northern Virginia with his parents. His new career was not very fruitful and in 1840 he was forced to sell off his prized possession, an entomological cabinet insect collection, to support himself. He ran an ad for it in Silliman's Journal, selling it for $400. Page visited Washington, D.C., often and moved there in 1842. He was Professor of Chemistry and Pharmacy from 1844 to 1849 in the Medical Department at Columbian College in Washington, D. C. (now George Washington University). He held other public roles also such as that of advising the choice of stone to be used in constructing the Smithsonian Institution and the Washington Monument to the committees in charge of these projects.

Career
Page worked in Washington, D.C., as a patent examiner for the U.S. Patent Office from 1853 through 1860. Page was a patent agent in 1853, 1854, and 1855 handling up to 50 successful patents a year. He processed patents for Eben Norton Horsford, a Harvard professor; Walter Hunt, inventor of the safety pin and sewing machine; Birdsill Holly, various mechanical devices; Theodore Weed, sewing machine mechanisms; Thomson Newbury, machine-tool attachments; John North, paper folding machines; Lysander Button, fire engine hydraulic paraphernalia with Robert Blake, who together created in 1860 the firm 'Button and Blake' that dominated the fire engine business in the United States for several years. Page was a patent counselor to friends like Ari Davis, who constructed mechanical apparatus and electrical devices for others and their inventions.
 
The American Civil War affected the Patent Office as much as the new administration of Abraham Lincoln did. The number of patent applications in 1860 was 7,653. In 1861, this dropped some 3,000 to about 4,600 applications. The office was required by law to be self-supporting but the commissioner under Lincoln throughout the war had a wake of dismissals. Sixteen examiners were authorized, however less than half that were filled by him. In addition in governing the department he demoted the examiners and paid them the salary for assistants. The amount of applications increased as the war went on and by 1864 was within 800 of the pre-war high and was over 10,000 in 1865. The examiners of the short staff had to handle three times that processed in the 1850s. Mindful accurate examinations were out of the question and a lackadaisical attitude came about to process the applications. Page passed nearly every application given to him to process, even without correcting the wording of the claim if wrong. Congress in time authorized a supplementary appropriation and the number of examiners was increased to twelve. However the examiners on staff were not paid any more and Page struggled to provide for his nearly dozen dependents on a monthly income of $150.
 
The time of the civil war was not a lucrative time for Page and in addition the Patent Office was partly converted to an army hospital so the environment around him was daunting. The war wreaked a further devastating impact on Page's scientific work and legacy. In 1863, Union soldiers stationed in the area of Page's home, broke into his laboratory as a random, unprovoked act of violence. His equipment, inventions and laboratory notebooks were destroyed. Some other inventions by Page which he had donated to the Smithsonian Institution were destroyed by a fire there in 1865. As a result of these destructive events, very few of Page's handmade devices exist today.

Page figured as a key witness in the Morse v. O'Reilly telegraph lawsuit of 1848. However, when Morse sought an extension of his patent on telegraph apparatus twelve years later, Page refuted Morse's role as inventor and was perhaps influential in the extensions' denial. Throughout his life, Page published more than one-hundred articles over the course of three distinct periods: the late 1830s, the mid-1840s, and the early 1850s. The first period (1837–1840) was especially crucial in developing his analytic skills. Over 40 of his articles appeared in American Journal of Science edited by Benjamin Silliman; some of these were reprinted at the time in William Sturgeon’s Annals of Electricity, Magnetism printed in Great Britain. The Royal Society Catalogue of Scientific Papers (1800–1863 volume) records many of Page's papers, however this listing is incomplete.

Scientific accomplishments

Self-inductive coil
While still a medical student at Harvard, Page conducted a ground-breaking experiment which demonstrated the presence of electricity in an arrangement of a spiral conductor that no one had tried before. His experiment was a response to a short paper by Joseph Henry, announcing that a strong electric shock was obtained from a ribbon strip of copper, spiralled up between fabric insulation, at the moment when battery current stopped running in this conductor. These strong shocks manifested the electrical property of self-inductance which Faraday had identified in researches published prior to Henry's publication, building on his own landmark discovery of electromagnetic induction. Page was not aware of Faraday's research on electricity that had inspired Henry to write his paper. He did his own experimentation to come to his own conclusions.

Page's innovation was to construct a spiral conductor having cups filled with mercury as electrical connectors that were placed at various positions along its length. He then connected a contact post from an electrochemical battery to the inner cup of the spiral, and put the other battery contact point into some other cup of the spiral. The direct battery current flowed through the spiral, from cup to cup. He held a metal wand in each hand, and put these wands into the same two cups as where the battery terminals went — or any other pair of cups. When an assistant removed one of the battery terminals, stopping the current from going in the spiral, Page received a shock. He reported stronger shocks when his hands covered more of the spiral's length than where direct battery current went. He even felt shocks from parts of the spiral where no direct battery current passed. He used acupuncture needles, pierced into his fingers, to amplify his sense of shock.

Page advocated the use of this shocking therapy device as a medical treatment known as galvanism, an early form of electrotherapy. His interest lay in heightening of electrical tension, or voltage above that of the low voltage battery input, and in its other electrical behaviors. Page went on to improve the inductive coil building a particularly effective instrument and giving it the name 'Dynamic Multiplier'. In order for Page's instrument to produce the shock, the battery current had to be stopped. In order to experience another shock, the battery had to be started again, and then stopped. This technique led Page to invent the first interrupters to provide a repeatable means of connecting and disconnecting the circuit. In these devices, electrical flow is started and stopped as a rocking or rotary motion lifts electrical contacts out of a mercury pool. An electric motor effect is responsible for the continued operation of the switch.

Crucial to Page's research with the spiral conductor was his capacity to do innovating experimenting with good results. Page did not provide an explanation for what he found, yet he extended and amplified the apparatus and its unexpected behaviors. Page's publication about his spiral instrument was well received in the American science community and in England, putting him into the upper ranks of American science at the time.

British experimenter William Sturgeon reprinted Page's article in his journal Annals of Electricity. Sturgeon provided an analysis of the electromagnetic effect involved; Page drew on and expanded Sturgeon's analysis in his own later work. Sturgeon devised coils that were adaptations of Page's instrument, where battery current flowed through one, inner, segment of a coil, and electrical shock was taken from the entire length of a secondary coil.

Through the input from Sturgeon, as well as his own continuing researches, Page developed coil instruments that were the foundation for the eventual induction coil. These instruments had two wires. One wire, termed the primary, carried battery current; a shock was taken at the ends of the other much longer wire, termed the secondary (see transformer). The primary wire was wound side by side one layer thick over an iron core; the secondary wire was wound over that several layers thick. Page developed a deep understanding of the underlying electromagnetic principles. In Page's published account of his coil, he termed it 
and its contact breaker the 'Compound Electro-Magnet and Electrotome'. Page's patent model for this coil is on display at Smithsonian National Museum of America's History.

Page invented different electrical current interrupters by mechanical means so that an induction coil would produce a high voltage from a low voltage battery. One was a mechanical vibrating interrupter (Figure 1) where a piece of soft iron wire one eighth of an inch in diameter and three inches in length is covered with insulated copper wire. This configured apparatus device is made to vibrate rapidly between the North and South poles of a horseshoe shaped magnet. The wire bar mechanism is suspended in mid-air at the edge of the magnet and well balanced. The wired bar is allowed to slightly touch the poles of the magnet giving it a spring effect. The little cups of mercury (p and n) are sections of glass tubes for the input low voltage to the iron wire and the produced output higher voltage from the copper wire. The vibration regulator is the thumb screw r and can be adjusted to give a rapid vibration to the wire bar.

Page put together another similar oscillating interrupter (Figure 2) where there were two sets of winding insulated wires coiled in opposite directions around the main soft iron wire. The configuration was mounted on an axis differently than the first configuration at ninety degrees and the bottom end allowed to swing back and forth between the North and South poles of a horseshoe magnet. As it oscillated back and forth a higher voltage was produced from the output second set of wires than the low voltage of the input wires of the first set of wires connected to the battery. In other words, the first set of wires was connected to the positive and negative poles of the battery by way of the interrupter and the second set of wires not connected to anything had an amplified voltage many times that of the battery when the oscillating interrupter was active. It was the make and break of the first set of wires of low voltage that caused an electromagnetic field to be produced and collapse. The magnetic field oscillating like this of coming about and then collapsing caused an electric current to come out of the second set of wires because there is a relationship between magnetism and electricity. The action of one causes a reaction of the other and this law of physics is what Page discovered in his experiments. The voltage of the second set of wires was an amplified high voltage, compared to the low battery voltage that was connected to the first set of wires that was interrupted.

Telephone technology
Page mounted a spiral conductor rigidly between the North and South poles of a suspended horseshoe magnet in a subsequent test trial exercise. When current stopped in the spiral, a ringing tone could be heard from the magnet, which Page termed galvanic music. Two notes were heard, one was the proper natural musical tone of the magnet and the other was an octave higher. It was after studying this phenomenon that Alexander Graham Bell progressed to inventing the telephone decades later. Other electrical engineers cited Page's electro-acoustic galvanic music mechanical vibrations as an important precedent for the development of telephone technology. Johann Philipp Reis constructed a telephone that produced a musical note based on Page's technology.

Page first observed this ringing sound in 1837 of galvanic music that came from a horseshoe magnet when it was brought close to a coil of wire of electric current that was disconnected and then reconnected. This phenomenon of electromagnetic sound was made the subject of investigation by other scientists worldwide. They concluded that the sound was due to molecular changes produced by the alternate magnetization and demagnetization of the metal and that these sound vibrations were related to the electrical interruptions. This all led to the advancement of the telephone for voice and the musical harmonic telephone. This first electromagnetic device of a horseshoe magnet converting electric power into sound is credited to Page, which the world labeled as the Page effect. M. Froment of Paris in 1846 exhibited an instrument that analysed Page's galvanic music and that was a precursor of German physicist Hermann von Helmholtz's experiment showing an electrical impulse of a certain vibration rate sent down a telegraph wire could cause a tuning fork at a far distance to resonate at that same rhythm.

Electric motor

Page invented many other electromagnetic devices, some of which involved the electromagnetic motor. Many prototypes devised by Page were turned into products manufactured and marketed by Boston instrument-maker Daniel Davis, Jr., the first American to practice in magnetic philosophical instruments, scientific instruments. One such prototype is Page's electrical reciprocating motor, with patent #10,480, the model for which is at the Smithsonian Museum. While consulting with Samuel F.B. Morse and Alfred Lewis Vail on the improvement of the telegraph, Page contributed to the adoption of suspended wires using a ground return and designed a signal receiver magnet. He also tested magneto-electricity as a potential source for replacing steam power. He was a person of moderate means and could not devote full time to his scientific work which resulted in slow progress.

Electromagnetic locomotive

Page developed in the 1840s what he termed the Axial Engine. This instrument used an electromagnetic solenoid coil to draw an iron rod into its hollow interior. The rod's displacement opened a switch that stopped current from flowing in the coil; then being unattracted, the rod reverted out of the coil, and this cycle repeated again. The resulting reciprocating motion of the rod back and forth, into and out of the coil, was converted to rotary motion by the mechanism. After demonstrating uses of this engine to run saws and pumps, Page successfully petitioned the U.S. Senate for funds to produce an electromagnetic locomotive, based on this design.

With these funds plus personal resources that took him into debt, Page built and tested the first full-sized electromagnetic locomotive, preceded only by the 1842 battery-powered model-sized Galvani of Scottish inventor Robert Davidson. Along the way, Page constructed a series of motors, revisions of the axial engine having different dimensions and mechanical features, which he tested thoroughly. The motor operated on large electrochemical cells, acid batteries having as electrodes zinc and costly platinum, with fragile clay diaphragms between the cells. Page's 1850 American Association for Advancement of Science presentation about his progress impressed Joseph Henry, Benjamin Silliman and other leading scientists.

On April 29, 1851, Page had boosted its motors from 8 to 20 HP power with $20,000 furnished by the United States government for development of an electric locomotive. Page conducted a full test, intending to run the  locomotive from Washington, D.C., to Baltimore and back with passengers on board with the train riding on a spur of the Baltimore and Ohio Railroad track. Prospective passengers were afraid to go on a train traveling at such a high speed.

Problems came about on the inaugural trip with high voltage sparks, resulting from effects Page later investigated as problems with the spiral conductor. The sparking broke through the insulation of the electrical coils resulting in short circuits. Page and his mechanic Ari Davis struggled to keep the locomotive operating, making necessary repairs as they went along. They reversed direction once arriving at Bladensburg for what became a troublesome problematic return to Washington, D.C.

The railroad vehicle was capable of carrying several passengers in addition to an operating crew. It had a wheel arrangement of 4-2-0 and constructed like an ordinary passenger rail-wagon coach with a fifteen foot long arch-roof and a six feet wide body. The train superstructure supported the forward truck end of the transport with four ordinary 30-inch steel wheels and the rear end was supported on two five foot high driving wheels. The woodwork of the carrier was constructed by a common house carpenter who had never seen close-up a train carriage being built. The driving wheels were assembled by mechanics not used to making mechanisms that complicated so were not put together with precision and were misaligned. As a result of Page's poor engineering for the project his railway train was a shameful result unworthy of the position it was to occupy in history.

The power for propelling the first all electric passenger train was furnished by one hundred Grove cell batteries carried under the carriage floor in an oblong trough between the driving wheels where the boiler and firebox were normally located in a typical train engine. The cells were 100 square inches each of a pair of electrode dividers. Many of the fragile battery cell clay dividers cracked and broke down during the jarring and shaking operation of the locomotive engine. In addition the consumption of zinc was immense, so between these two maintenance items the expense of running a battery operated locomotive was prohibitive in a commercial application.

The failures of Page's electromagnetic locomotive test run were cautionary to other inventors who eventually found other means than batteries to produce electrically driven locomotion. Before Page began his attempt, work such as that of James Prescott Joule had generated a general consensus among scientists that the battery powered electric engine was an impractical device. Page had disregarded those findings and never gave up believing in the potential of his design of an on-board electric source for locomotive power.

Unmasking pseudoscience
Comfortable himself in public performance as a popular lecturer and singer, being skilled in ventriloquism as well, Page was astute in detecting the misuse of performative acts in defrauding a gullible public. One class of fraudulent schemes prevalent at the time involved communications with spirits by means of rapping sounds, the motion of a table, or other such signs produced in the vicinity of the perpetrator-medium. The sounds and motions were attributed to occult forces and forms of electricity. The Fox sisters, of Rochester New York, made these claims notorious by exhibiting in public and private settings, while collecting money from their audiences. Page's efforts to expose these frauds at their human roots stems in part from his keen concern for furthering the public understanding of science and their proficient use of its findings and benefits. In this undertaking, Page allied with contemporary Michael Faraday and other scientists who have sought to debunk the unscrupulous applications of pseudoscience upon a willing and gullible public.

Investigating some of these performers in person, Page produced a book titled Psychomancy: spirit-rappings and table-tippings exposed that uncovers various means of deception they employed. He described his analysis of these techniques during a sitting with the Fox sisters. Each time a critical observer peered under the table around which the sisters were seated, the spirit rapping ceased; whenever the observer sat upright, the sounds recommenced. Page asked to have the spirit sounds displayed elsewhere than via the table. One sister climbed into a wardrobe closet. Page identified where her long dress (concealing a stick or other apparatus) contacted the wardrobe. Through his expert knowledge of ventriloquism, Page detected how this performer was misdirecting the viewer's attention away from the actual source of the sound while building expectations to suppose the sound came from elsewhere than the source. However the trick was "poorly done" and the girl could not control it so as to produce any spirit communication.

Going on to reveal other fraudulent practices, Page addressed the relationship at work between performer and audience by which both functioned as perpetrators. He said that the prime movers in all these so-called miracles were impostors, and that those who believed them were gullible. While the former was filling their coffers at the expense of the latter, they often indulged in secret amusement at the faith of their supporters. This was particularly true at the consultations of the learned clergy and others upon electricity and magnetism considered the new fluid of the devil's immediate agency as the probable cause of these strange phenomena.

Controversy and impact from politics, war, and patents
Page's scientific undertakings brought him into public arenas where politics and controversy held sway. A tension early to arise in his career as patent examiner was that of the conflict of interest between the privileged information he had regarding applicants' patents, and his private consulting with particular inventors on the side. Following his appearance in the 1848 Morse v O'Reilly lawsuit over the telegraph, Page took a more careful stance in his role as patent examiner. Thereafter, he refrained from transmitting such privileged information to rival patent applicants. However, the well-paid public post of patent examiner put the occupants continually under scrutiny by politicians, scientists, and aspiring inventors. Both Congress and the executive branch exerted control and influence over policy and practices in the patent office. In the early years of the United States Patent and Trademark Office, a patent examiner was expected to be highly trained, knowledgeable in all the sciences, informed on current and past technology. Page was an exemplar of this ideal and became the chief patent examiner. As Page continued in the job of senior examiner he developed a keen eye for detecting fraudulent scientific claims, although he was a patent advocate.

The number of patents submitted to the agency in his time at the prestigious job increased sharply, however the number of patents granted was the same or less, and the number of patent examiners was unchanged. Inventors seeking patents, becoming incensed about decisions made against them, coalesced into a lobby with a voice projected through the journal Scientific American. This lobby advocated "liberalization" — more leniency in the granting of patents, giving the inventor the "benefit of the doubt"— and argued against the scientific research being sponsored by the Smithsonian Institution under Joseph Henry.

Henry took a hard line, decrying inventors' "futile attempts to innovate and improve". The elite professionalized science that Henry was building up through the Smithsonian and other organizations treated as low status the having or seeking of a patent; patents were not considered a contribution to science. While Page set out to show that gaining patents was genuine scientific work, he fell out of favor with the scientific establishment. His friendship with Henry petered out, and Page was no longer held in high regard as part of elite science.

Page shifted in his position on the granting of patents. As an examiner of patents, he was scrupulous and fair. Through his own experience as an inventor and association with other inventors, he allied with their concerns. On his resignation from the patent agency, Page used the American Journal of Science as a forum to critique and even lambast the agency and policies which he had upheld for 10 years prior. He had played a role in shaping government customs when inside the patent office and now in reshaping the policies from an outside view.

Page found a political ally in Thomas Hart Benton, senator from Missouri. Benton requested funds for Page to develop a warship powered on electromagnetism. This petition met with serious opposition in the Senate. Senator Henry Stuart Foote countered that Page had not proved substantial progress or benefits from his work. Senator Jefferson Finis Davis objected to the appropriation of government funds to one inventor, while other inventors such as Thomas Davenport went unsupported. Both the US Senate and House nixed any further funds for a Page's project.

By the 1860s, the induction coil was becoming a prominent instrument of physics research. Instrument-makers in America, Great Britain and the European continent contributed in developing the construction and operation of induction coils. Premiere among these instrument makers was Heinrich Daniel Ruhmkorff, who in 1864 received from Emperor Napoleon III the prestigious Volta Prize along with a 50,000 franc award for his introduction of the induction coil. Page maintained that the devices he developed in the 1830s were not markedly different from the induction coil and that other American inventors had filled in with improvements that were better than anything made by Ruhmkorff — and alleging that Ruhmkorff had plagiarized the coil of another American instrument-maker, Edward Samuel Ritchie.

A special act passed by the U.S. House and Senate, and signed by President Andrew Johnson authorized what was later dubbed "The Page Patent". Page died a few weeks later, in May 1868. Instead of dying with him, the Page patent went on to play a major role in the politics and economics of the telegraph industry. Page's lawyer and heirs successfully argued that the patent covered the mechanisms involved in "all known forms of telegraphy". An interest in the patent was sold to the Western Union Co; together Western Union and the Page heirs reaped lucrative benefits. Page's patent secured a life 'in style' for his widow and heirs. Although he was no longer living, it figured as yet another violation, on his part, of the behavior code under the emerging professionalization of science of the day, under which science was to be conducted for its own sake, without accruing apparent political or financial gain.

Personal life 
Page in 1843 became engaged to Priscilla Sewall Webster who was the younger sister of the wife of a Washington physician, Harvey Lindsly. Lindsly happened to be among Page's colleagues. Page married Priscilla in 1844 and the couple had a son who died in infancy. They then had three more sons and two daughters that grew to adulthood and outlived him. Their oldest daughter, Emelyn or Emmie, died less than a year after Page's own death. Their youngest son, Harvey Lindsly Page (1859–1934), was named for his uncle and was a famous American architect and inventor of San Antonio, Texas.

Page's many contributions have slipped from the view of most historians with little remaining of his experimental work and notes. He suffered debt, terminal illness and isolation from the mainstream scientific community in his last years. Page published anonymously a lengthy, closely researched yet self-promoting book titled American Claim to Induction Coil and its electrostatic developments. He died in Washington, D.C., on May 5, 1868. Page's wife Priscilla died August 7, 1894.

See also 
Thomas Hall

References

Sources

Patents
C.G. Page, U.S. Patent 20,507, "Head Rest"
C.G. Page, U.S. Patent 76,654, "Induction Coil Apparatus and Circuit Breaker "

External links 

Works by Charles Grafton Page at Project Gutenberg
 Instruments for Natural Philosophy - Daniel Davis Jr. Apparatus
 “PV Scientific Instruments:  About Induction Coils”
History of Induction / American Claim to Induction Coil and Its Electrostatic Developments By Charles Grafton Page (1867)
Psychomancy : spirit-rappings and table-tippings exposed. Page, 1853

American physicists
19th-century American inventors
People associated with electricity
19th-century American people
1812 births
1868 deaths
People from Salem, Massachusetts
Harvard Medical School alumni
Harvard College alumni